The Ghost Festival or Hungry Ghost Festival, also known as the Zhongyuan Festival (traditional Chinese: 中元節;) in Taoism and Yulanpen Festival  in Buddhism, is a traditional Taoist and Buddhist festival held in certain East Asian countries. According to the Chinese calendar (a lunisolar calendar), the Ghost Festival is on the 15th night of the seventh month (14th in parts of southern China). 

In Chinese culture, the fifteenth day of the seventh month in the lunar calendar is called Ghost Day and the seventh month in general is regarded as the Ghost Month, in which ghosts and spirits, including those of deceased ancestors, come out from the lower realm. Distinct from both the Qingming Festival (or Tomb Sweeping Day, in spring) and Double Ninth Festival (in autumn) in which living descendants pay homage to their deceased ancestors, during Ghost Festival, the deceased are believed to visit the living.

On the fifteenth day the realms of Heaven and Hell and the realm of the living are open and both Taoists and Buddhists would perform rituals to transmute and absolve the sufferings of the deceased. Intrinsic to the Ghost Month is veneration of the dead, where traditionally the filial piety of descendants extends to their ancestors even after their deaths. Activities during the month would include preparing ritualistic food offerings, burning incense, and burning joss paper, a papier-mâché form of material items such as clothes, gold and other fine goods for the visiting spirits of the ancestors. Elaborate meals (often vegetarian meals) would be served with empty seats for each of the deceased in the family treating the deceased as if they are still living. Ancestor worship is what distinguishes Qingming Festival from Ghost Festival because the latter includes paying respects to all deceased, including the same and younger generations, while the former only includes older generations. Other festivities may include buying and releasing miniature paper boats and lanterns on water, which signifies giving directions to the lost ghosts and spirits of the ancestors and other deities.

Origins

The name relates to the concept of the hungry ghost, the Chinese translation of the term preta in Buddhism. It plays a role in Chinese Buddhism and Taoism as well as in Chinese folk religion, and represents beings who were originally living people, who have died, and who are driven by intense emotional needs in an animalistic way.

As a Taoist festival: Taoism has the "Three Yuan Theory", from which the name "Zhong Yuan" comes from. In the Tang dynasty, when the rulers admired Taoism, the Taoist Zhongyuan Festival began to flourish, and the "Zhongyuan" was gradually fixed as the name of the festival. The festival was set on July 15 of the lunar calendar and has continued to the present day.

As a Buddhist festival: The origin story of the modern Ghost Festival, ultimately originated from ancient India, deriving from the Mahayana scripture known as the Yulanpen or Ullambana Sutra.  The sutra records the time when Maudgalyayana achieves abhijñā and uses his newfound powers to search for his deceased parents.  Maudgalyayana discovers that his deceased mother was reborn into the preta or hungry ghost realm.  She was in a wasted condition and Maudgalyayana tried to help her by giving her a bowl of rice.  Unfortunately as a preta, she was unable to eat the rice as it was transformed into burning coal.  Maudgalyayana then asks the Buddha to help him; whereupon Buddha explains how one is able to assist one's current parents and deceased parents in this life and in one's past seven lives by willingly offering food, etc., to the sangha or monastic community during Pravarana (the end of the monsoon season or vassa), which usually occurs on the 15th day of the seventh month whereby the monastic community transfers the merits to the deceased parents, etc.,     

The Theravadan forms of the festival in South and Southeast Asia (including Cambodia's Pchum Ben) are much older, deriving from the Petavatthu, a scripture in the Pali Canon that probably dates to the 3rdcenturyBC. The Petavatthu account is broadly similar to that later recorded in the Yulanpen Sutra, although it concerns the disciple Sāriputta and his family rather than Moggallāna.

Observance

The Ghost Festival is held during the seventh month of the Chinese calendar. It also falls at the same time as a full moon, the new season, the fall harvest, the peak of Buddhist monastic asceticism, the rebirth of ancestors, and the assembly of the local community. During this month, the gates of hell are opened up and ghosts are free to roam the earth where they seek food and entertainment. These ghosts are believed to be ancestors of those who forgot to pay tribute to them after they died, or those who were never given a proper ritual send-off. They have long needle-thin necks because they have not been fed by their family, or as a punishment so that they are unable to swallow. Family members offer prayers to their deceased relatives, offer food and drink and burn hell bank notes and other forms of joss paper. Joss paper items are believed to have value in the afterlife, considered to be very similar in some aspects to the material world. People burn paper houses, cars, servants and televisions to please the ghosts. Families also pay tribute to other unknown wandering ghosts so that these homeless souls do not intrude on their lives and bring misfortune. A large feast is held for the ghosts on the fourteenth day of the seventh month, when people bring samples of food and place them on an offering table to please the ghosts and ward off bad luck. Lotus-shaped lanterns are lit and set afloat in rivers and out onto seas to symbolically guide the lost souls of forgotten ancestors to the afterlife.

In some East Asian countries today, live performances are held and everyone is invited to attend. The first row of seats are always empty as this is where the ghosts sit. The shows are always put on at night and at high volumes as the sound is believed to attract and please the ghosts. Some shows include Chinese opera, dramas, and in some areas, even burlesque shows. Traditionally Chinese opera was the main source of entertainment but the newer shows, concerts, dramas, wars and so forth are referred to as Getai.  These acts are better known as "Merry-making".

For rituals, Buddhists and Taoists hold ceremonies to relieve ghosts from suffering, many of them holding ceremonies in the afternoon or at night (as it is believed that the ghosts are released from hell when the sun sets). Altars are built for the deceased and priests and monks alike perform rituals for the benefit of ghosts. Monks and priests often throw rice or other small foods into the air in all directions to distribute them to the ghosts.

During the evening, incense is burnt in front of the doors of households. Incense stands for prosperity in Chinese culture, so families believe that there is more prosperity in burning more incense.  During the festival, some shops are closed as they want to leave the streets open for the ghosts. In the middle of each street stands an altar of incense with fresh fruit and sacrifices displayed on it.

Fourteen days after the festival, to make sure all the hungry ghosts find their way back to hell, people float water lanterns and set them outside their houses. These lanterns are made by setting a lotus flower-shaped lantern on a paper boat. The lanterns are used to direct the ghosts back to the underworld, and when they go out, it symbolizes that they have found their way back.

Celebrations in other parts of Asia

Singapore and Malaysia 
Concert-like performances are a prominent feature of the Ghost Festival in Singapore and Malaysia. Those live concerts are popularly known as Getai in Mandarin or Koh-tai in Hokkien Chinese. They are performed by groups of singers, dancers, entertainers and opera troops or puppet shows on a temporary stage that is set up within a residential district. The festival is funded by the residents of each individual district. During these Getai the front row is left empty for the special guests—the ghosts. It is known to be bad luck to sit on the front row of red seats, if anyone were to sit on them, they would become sick or similarly ailed.

Indonesia
In Indonesia, the festival popularly known as Chit Gwee Pua, Chit Nyiat Pan in Hakka, Cioko, or Sembahyang Rebutan in Indonesian (Scrambling prayer). People gather around temples and bring an offering to a spirit who died in an unlucky way, and after that, they distribute it to the poor, the way people scramble the offerings is the origin of the festival name, these festival mostly known in Java Island. Other areas like at North Sumatra, Riau and Riau islands also held a live concert or known as Getai like those Chinese in Malaysia or Singapore, and there are also time for people who do Tomb sweeping or known as Sembahyang Kubur to respect to the ancestor spirit and looking for some luck, they will bought like a hell notes or Kim Cua and paper-based goods like paper house, paper horse, paper car etc., those goods will end up burned as it was believed that goods will sent to help the spirit feel better in afterlife.

Taiwan
Traditionally, it is believed that ghosts haunt the island of Taiwan for the entire seventh lunar month, when the mid-summer Ghost Festival is held. The month is known as Ghost Month. The first day of the month is marked by opening the gate of a temple, symbolizing the gates of hell. On the twelfth day, lamps on the main altar are lit. On the thirteenth day, a procession of lanterns is held. On the fourteenth day, a parade is held for releasing water lanterns. Incense and food are offered to the spirits to deter them from visiting homes and spirit paper money is also burnt as an offering. During the month, people avoid surgery, buying cars, swimming, moving house, marrying, whistling and going out or taking pictures after dark. It is also important that addresses are not revealed to the ghosts.

Japan

Chūgen

Chūgen (中元), also , is an annual event in Japan on the 15th day of the 7th lunar month, when people give gifts to their superiors and acquaintances. Originally it was an annual event for giving gifts to the ancestral spirits.

Bon

Obon (sometimes transliterated O-bon), or simply Bon, is the Japanese version of the Ghost Festival. It has since been transformed over time into a family reunion holiday during which people from the big cities return to their home towns and visit and clean the resting places of their ancestors.

Traditionally including a dance festival called Bon Odori, Obon has existed in Japan for more than 500 years. In modern Japan, it is held on July 15 in the eastern part (Kantō) and on August 15 in the western part (Kansai).  In Okinawa and the Amami Islands, it is celebrated as in China, on the 15th day of the 7th lunar month. In 2019, Obon was held on the same date in Kansai, Okinawa and the Amami Islands, as August 15 on that year, was also the 15th day of the 7th lunar month.

Vietnam

This festival is originally known as Tết Trung Nguyên and is viewed as a time for the pardoning of condemned souls who are released from hell. The "homeless" should be "fed" and appeased with offerings of food. Merits for the living are also earned by the release of birds and fish. The lunar month in which the festival takes place is colloquially known as Tháng Cô Hồn - the month of lonely spirits, and believed to be haunted and particularly unlucky.

Influenced by Buddhism, this holiday coincides with Vu Lan, the Vietnamese transliteration for Ullambana.

In modern times, Vu Lan is also seen as Parents' Day. People with living parents would bear a red rose and would give thanks while those without can choose to bear a white rose; and attend services to pray for the deceased.

Related Buddhist traditions in other parts of Asia
In Asian Theravadin Buddhist countries, related traditions, ceremonies and festivals also occur. Like its Ullambana Sutra-origins in Mahayana Buddhist countries, the Theravada scripture, the Petavatthu gave rise to the idea of offering food to the hungry ghosts in the Theravada tradition as a form of merit-making. In stories published in the Petavatthu Maudgalyayana, who also plays the central role in the rise of the concept in the Mahayana tradition, along with Sariputta also play a role in the rise of the concept in the Theravada tradition. Similarly to the rise of the concept in Mahayana Buddhism, a version of Maudgalyayana Rescues His Mother, where Maudgalyayana is replaced by Sariputta is recorded in the Petavatthu and is in part the basis behind the practice of the concept in Theravadin societies. The concept of offering food to the hungry ghosts is also found in early Buddhist literature, in the Tirokudda Kanda.

Cambodia

In Cambodia, a fifteen-day-long annual festival known as Pchum Ben occurs generally in September or October. Cambodians pay their respects to deceased relatives up to seven generations. The gates of hell are believed to open during this period and many people make offerings to these hungry ghosts.

Laos
In Laos, a festival known as, Boun khao padap din usually occurs in September each year and goes on for two weeks. During this period, it is believed that hungry ghosts are freed from hell and enter the world of the living. A second festival known as Boun khao salak occurs directly after the conclusion of Boun khay padab din. During this period, food offerings are made to the hungry ghosts.

Sri Lanka

In Sri Lanka, food offerings are made to the hungry ghosts on the seventh day, three months and one year after the death day of a deceased person. It is a ceremony conducted after death as part of traditional Sri Lankan Buddhist funeral rites and is known as mataka dānēs or matakadānaya. The offerings that are made acquire merit which are then transformed back into the equivalent goods in the world of the hungry ghosts. The offering that is offered on the seventh day, comes a day after personalized food offerings are given in the garden to the spirit of the deceased relative, which occurs on the sixth day. The deceased who do not reach the proper afterworld, the Hungry Ghost realm, are feared by the living as they are believed to cause various sicknesses and disasters to the living. Buddhist monks are called upon to perform pirit to ward off the floating spirits. The rite is also practiced in Thailand and Myanmar and is also practiced during the Ghost Festival that is observed in other Asian countries.

Thailand

In Thailand, a fifteen-day-long annual festival known as Sat Thai is celebrated between September and October in Thailand especially in southern Thailand, particularly in the province of Nakhon Si Thammarat. Like related festivals and traditions in other parts of Asia, the deceased are believed to come back to earth for fifteen days and people make offerings to them. The festival is known as Sat Thai to differentiate it from the Chinese Ghost Festival which is known as Sat Chin in the Thai language.

Related Hindu traditions in other parts of Asia

India

The performance of Shraddha by a son during Pitru Paksha is regarded as compulsory by Hindus, to ensure that the soul of the ancestor goes to heaven. In this context, the scripture Garuda Purana says, "there is no salvation for a man without a son". The scriptures preach that a householder should propitiate ancestors (Pitris), along with the gods (devas), ghosts (bhutas) and guests. The scripture Markandeya Purana says that if the ancestors are content with the shraddhas, they will bestow health, wealth, knowledge and longevity, and ultimately heaven and salvation (moksha) upon the performer.

Indonesia
In Bali and some parts of Indonesia, particularly among the indigenous Hindus of Indonesia, ancestors who have died and cremated are said to return to visit their former homes. This day is known as Hari Raya Galungan and celebrations typically last over two weeks, often in the form of specific food and religious offerings along with festivities. The festival date is often calculated according to the Balinese pawukon calendar and typically occurs every 210 days.

In popular culture 
This article was the topic of conversation in the first episode of series two of the web series "Two Of These People Are Lying" hosted by The Technical Difficulties. Notably, Tom Scott believed it.

See also 
 Buddhist art
 Chinese ghosts
 Nine Emperor God / Festival of Nine Emperor God (Hokkien: Kow Ong Yah, Cantonese: Kow Wong Yeh)
 Phi Ta Khon 
 Tōrō nagashi

Notes on references

References

General bibliography 
 .
 
 .
 
 
 
 .
 .

External links

 The Bristol University Buddhist Death Ritual Project Images and a documentary film by Ingmar Heise and Han Zhang "The Spirit's Happy Days: Buddhist Festivals for the Dead in Southeast China" can be downloaded there.
 Zhongyuan Festival
 Chinese Ghost Culture
 Hong Kong University Library Digital Archives Oral History Project of Hong Kong
 

August observances
Buddhism in China
Buddhist festivals in Japan
Buddhist festivals
Cambodian culture
Chinese culture
Chinese ghosts
Chinese-Malaysian culture
Festivals in Chinese folk religion
Festivals in Hong Kong
Festivals in Laos
Festivals in Sri Lanka
Festivals in Taiwan
Ghosts
Japanese culture
Lantern shows
Lao culture
Malay ghost myth
Observances held on the full moon
Observances honoring the dead
Observances set by the Chinese calendar
Public holidays in China
Public holidays in Vietnam
Religious festivals in Cambodia
Religious festivals in China
Buddhist festivals in the Philippines
Religious festivals in Malaysia
Religious festivals in Singapore
Religious festivals in Sri Lanka
Religious festivals in Thailand
Religious festivals in Vietnam
September observances
Taiwanese culture
Taoist festivals
Vietnamese culture